The 2005 season of the 3. divisjon, the fourth highest association football league for men in Norway.

Between 20 and 22 games (depending on group size) were played in 24 groups, with 3 points given for wins and 1 for draws. Twelve teams were promoted to the 2. divisjon through playoff.

Tables 

Group 1
Fredrikstad 2 – lost playoff
Sparta Sarpsborg 2
Østsiden
Fagerborg
Lisleby
Skeid 2
Kolbotn
Årvoll
Greåker
Grorud
Rakkestad – relegated
Borgar – relegated

Group 2
Korsvoll – won playoff
Moss 2
Trøgstad/Båstad
Råde
Grei
Sprint-Jeløy 2
Gresvik
St. Hanshaugen
Selbak
Rygge
Kvik Halden 2 – relegated
Grüner – relegated

Group 3
Vålerenga 2 – won playoff
Follo 2
KFUM
Ullern
Skjetten
Blaker
Klemetsrud
Bærum 2
Øvrevoll/Hosle
Fet
Frogner – relegated
Sørumsand – relegated

Group 4
Asker – lost playoff
Strømmen
Lyn 2
Bjørkelangen
Fjellhamar
Fossum
Røa
Kjelsås 2
Høland
Hauger
Rælingen – relegated
Mercantile 2 – pulled team

Group 5
Elverum – lost playoff
Kongsvinger 2
Sander
Bjerke
Trysil
Eidsvold
Stange
Galterud
Ottestad
Funnefoss/Vormsund
Flisa
Grue – relegated

Group 6
Ham-Kam 2 – won playoff
Ringsaker
Hamar
Ringebu/Fåvang
Lom
Fart
Vardal
Vang – relegated
SAFK Fagernes
Redalen
Fron – relegated
Vind – relegated

Group 7
Åmot – won playoff
Kolbu/KK
Vestli
Raufoss 2
Jevnaker
Andes
Toten
Hønefoss BK 2
Hadeland
Hønefoss SK – relegated
Ihle
Nittedal – relegated

Group 8
Stabæk 2 – won playoff
Mjøndalen
Birkebeineren
Åskollen
Konnerud
Kongsberg
Bygdø Monolitten
Solberg
Åssiden
Strømsgodset 2
ROS – relegated
Drafn – relegated

Group 9
Eik-Tønsberg – lost playoff
Flint
Runar
Borre
Larvik Turn
Sandar
Holmestrand
Ivrig
Tjølling
Sem
Stokke – relegated
Larvik Fotball 2 – pulled team

Group 10
Pors Grenland 2
Skarphedin – lost playoff
Langesund/Stathelle
Herkules
FK Arendal
Skotfoss
Urædd
Odd Grenland 3
Tollnes 2 – relegated
Brevik
Kjapp – relegated
Fyresdal – pulled team

Group 11
Start 2 – won playoff
Jerv
Lyngdal
Vindbjart
Vigør
Søgne
Mandalskameratene 2
Tveit
Donn
Grane
Våg
Sørfjell – relegated

Group 12
Randaberg – lost playoff
Stavanger
Sandnes Ulf 2
Staal Jørpeland
Vidar
Buøy
Vaulen
Havørn
Bjerkreim
Varhaug
Hundvåg – relegated
Eiger – relegated

Group 13
Bryne 2
Kopervik – won playoff
Haugesund 2
Vardeneset
Åkra
Skjold
Nord
Frøyland
Avaldsnes
Vedavåg Karmøy
Sola – relegated
Figgjo – relegated

Group 14
Askøy – won playoff
Nest-Sotra
Follese
Os
Vadmyra
Trio
Stord/Moster 2
Solid
Øygard
Trott – relegated
Bremnes – relegated
Halsnøy – relegated

Group 15
Voss – lost playoff
Radøy/Manger
Arna-Bjørnar
Norheimsund
Hald
Frøya
Gneist
Austevoll
Lyngbø
Sandviken
Varegg – relegated
Nymark – relegated

Group 16
Stryn – lost playoff
Sogndal 2
Førde
Fjøra
Tornado Måløy
Høyang
Skavøypoll
Kaupanger
Sandane
Dale
Jotun 2 – relegated
Florø – relegated

Group 17
Aalesund 2
Volda – lost playoff
Spjelkavik
Hareid
Skarbøvik
Sykkylven
Langevåg
Valder
Ørsta
Bergsøy
Blindheim/Emblem – relegated
Stranda – relegated

Group 18
Kristiansund – won playoff
Averøykameratene
Sunndal
Surnadal
Gossen
Dahle
Elnesvågen/Omegn
Midsund
Eide og Omegn
Bryn
Bud – relegated
Åndalsnes – relegated

Group 19
KIL/Hemne – won playoff
Tynset
Orkla
Rosenborg 3
Flå
NTNUI
Strindheim 2
Stjørdals-Blink
Fram
Buvik
Melhus – relegated
Sverresborg – relegated

Group 20
Nardo – lost playoff
Rørvik
Nidelv
Namsos
Levanger 2
Rissa
Verdal
Bjørgan
Selbu
Kvik
Malvik
Kolstad 2 – relegated

Group 21
Steigen – won playoff
Bodø/Glimt 2
Mosjøen
Stålkameratene
Fauske/Sprint
Junkeren
Brønnøysund
Meløy
Mo 2
Herøy/Dønna
Saltdalkameratene – relegated

Group 22
Mjølner – lost playoff
Vesterålen (->Sortland)
Grovfjord
Skånland
Medkila
Morild
Andenes
Ballangen
Leknes
Hadsel – relegated
Ballstad – relegated
Beisfjord – relegated

Group 23
Tromsø 2 – lost playoff
Salangen
Senja
Ishavsbyen
Skjervøy
Tromsdalen 2
Fløya
Bardu
Nordreisa
Ramfjord – relegated
Kvaløysletta – relegated
Storsteinnes – relegated

Group 24
Hammerfest – won playoff
Bossekop
Kirkenes
Alta 2
Kautokeino
Båtsfjord
Porsanger
Norild
Sørøy/Glimt
Tverrelvdalen
Nordlys
Honningsvåg – relegated

Playoffs

References
NIFS

Norwegian Third Division seasons
4
Norway
Norway